Eduarda "Duda" Santos Lisboa (born 1 August 1998) is a Brazilian beach volleyball player. She is the two-time U21 World champion (2016, 2017) and three-time U19 World champion (2013, 2014, 2016). She has won four World Tour events and reached thirteen podiums in the World Tour throughout her career. She was voted the FIVB Top Rookie in 2016. She was also a gold medalist at the 2014 Summer Youth Olympics.

Duda plays as a right-side defender.

References

External links

 
 
 
 
 Duda at Confederação Brasileira de Voleibol 

1998 births
Living people
Brazilian women's beach volleyball players
People from Aracaju
Beach volleyball players at the 2014 Summer Youth Olympics
FIVB World Tour award winners
Beach volleyball defenders
Youth Olympic gold medalists for Brazil
Beach volleyball players at the 2020 Summer Olympics
Sportspeople from Sergipe
21st-century Brazilian women